P. nivea may refer to:
 Pagodroma nivea, the snow petrel, a bird species that breeds on the Antarctic Peninsula, South Georgia Islands and other islands of the Scotia Archipelago
 Panchlora nivea, the banana cockroach, an insect species found in Cuba and the Caribbean
 Pieris nivea, a synonym for Elodina padusa
 Plasmopara nivea, a plant pathogen species
 Procanthia nivea, a moth species found in South Africa
 Propebela nivea, a sea snail species
 Prostanthera nivea, the snowy mint-bush, a shrub species native to Queensland, New South Wales and Victoria in Australia

See also 
 Nivea (disambiguation)